Bolshechernigovsky District is an administrative and municipal district (raion), one of the twenty-seven in Samara Oblast, Russia. It is located in the south of the oblast. Its administrative center is the rural locality (a selo) of Bolshaya Chernigovka. As of the 2010 Census, the total population of the district was 20,477, with the population of Bolshaya Chernigovka accounting for 33.2% of that number.

History
The district was established on February 19, 1935.

Notable people
Hadiya Davletshina, Bashkir poet, writer, and playwright

References

Notes

Sources

Districts of Samara Oblast
States and territories established in 1935